Due to its unique geography, being made of two peninsulas surrounded by the Great Lakes, Michigan has depended on many ferries for connections to transport people, vehicles and trade. The most famous modern ferries are those which carry people and goods across the Straits of Mackinac to the car-free Mackinac Island but before the Mackinac Bridge was built, large numbers of ferries carried people and cars between the two peninsulas. Other ferries continue to provide transportation to small islands and across the Detroit River to Canada. Ferries once provided transport to island parks for city dwellers. The state's only national park, Isle Royale cannot be reached by road and is normally accessed by ferry. The largest ferries in Michigan are the car ferries which cross Lake Michigan to Wisconsin. One of these, the SS Badger is one of the last remaining coal steamers on the Great Lakes and serves as a section of US Highway 10 (US 10). The Badger is also the largest ferry in Michigan, capable of carrying 600 passengers and 180 autos.

As of 2018, there are 18 ferry routes in Michigan, 13 of which have ferries which can carry vehicles. Three ferry routes cross the international border between U.S. and Canada. Ferry trips can be as short as a few minutes crossing a river to as long as seven hours crossing Lake Superior. These routes are all closed in the winter when the rivers and lakes are iced over. Winter closures can be as long as four months a year. Four passenger-only ferry destinations are islands without private vehicles and, in some cases, without even roads. One unique human-powered ferry takes passengers across the Kalamazoo River to a park with a Lake Michigan beach.  

In the early days of lake transport, it is difficult or impossible to differentiate between ferries, package freighters carrying passengers, and passenger liners on regular routes. The lakes and rivers often provided an easier route of travel than primitive or non-existent roads. Rail ferries would carry passenger trains and their occupants as well as freight cars, and later sometimes carried automobiles as well. Several of the busiest ferry routes were replaced by bridges or tunnels: Detroit to Windsor, Belle Isle, the Sault Ste. Maries, St. Ignace to Mackinaw City, Port Huron to Sarnia. Boblo ceased to be a destination with the closure of the amusement park. Changes in laws and industry lead to the end of the Lake Michigan railroad ferries.

The first autos crossed the Straits of Mackinac in 1917 on the SS Chief Wawatam. In 1923, the state of Michigan began an auto ferry service that was the first such system to be state-owned. It continued until the day the Mackinac Bridge opened. The law required the ferry service to cease so that the bridge would not have competition and could pay off its construction bonds faster. The passenger ferries and many of the rail ferries across the Detroit and St. Clair rivers had ended after the bridges and tunnels were built.

The ferries pioneered concepts in ship design and icebreaking techniques. Bow propellers and steel spoon-shaped bows made the rail ferries the best icebreakers on the lakes for many years until the dedicated U.S. Coast Guard icebreakers were assigned during World War II. In contrast, the ferries later had some of the most outdated equipment on the Lakes. The Badger, still in service in 2019, is the last coal-fired Great Lakes passenger steamer. The Chief Wawatam was the last hand-fed coal steamer and the Landsdowne was the last paddlewheeler when it was converted to a barge in 1970.

The Detroit-Windsor ferries were popular with small-scale bootleggers during Prohibition, especially as border guards were reluctant to search young Canadian women who worked in Detroit offices.

Automobile ferries

Lake Charlevoix
  Charlevoix At Ironton, Michigan is a four-car cable ferry that crosses a narrow point on the South Arm of Lake Charlevoix in the U.S. Located on Ferry Road off Michigan Route 66.

Lake Michigan

Cross-lake
 SS Badger, cross-lake, Ludington, Michigan to Manitowoc, Wisconsin, connecting US Highway 10 (US 10) with its counterpart in Wisconsin, 4 hours
 HSC Lake Express, cross-lake, Muskegon, Michigan to Milwaukee, Wisconsin, 2.5 hours

Beaver Island
Current boats
 Beaver Islander, (built 1962), Charlevoix, Michigan to Beaver Island, 2 hours
 Emerald Isle, (built 1997), Charlevoix to Beaver Island, 2 hours
Retired boats
Emerald Isle (built 1955), in use 1955–62, then a Mackinac ferry until 1982, now Diamond Jack cruise on the Detroit River
South Shore, (built 1945), for Miller Boat Line, Put-in-Bay, Ohio. Operated to Beaver Island from 1973-1997. Sold in 1999 to Shoreline Sightseeing Cruises, Chicago.

St. Marys River
Ferry service to Sugar Island began in 1928 and to Neebish Island service in 1933, provided by private companies. The Eastern Upper Peninsula Transportation Authority assumed their operations in 1980.

Neebish Island
Neebish Islander II, (built 1946), Neebish Island ferry, Barbeau, former Sugar Islander I 
Neebish Islander III, (built 2022)

Sugar Island
Sugar Islander II, (built 1995), Sugar Island to Sault Ste. Marie

Lake Huron

Bois Blanc Island
 Kristen D (1987), Cheboygan to Bois Blanc Island

Drummond Island
Current boats
De Tour Village to Drummond Island, connecting M-134 across the DeTour Passage, since 1975, part of the Eastern Upper Peninsula Transportation Authority
Drummond Islander III (built 1989)
Drummond Islander IV, (built 2000)
Retired boats
Clyde, in use 1905–08
Naida, in use 1915–24
Drummond, in use 1922–24 and 1931–32
Phillip, in use 1922–30, destroyed by fire
Wallan (built 1933), in use 1933–47, run by Road Commission from 1943 as Sam C. Taylor
Drummond Islander I (built 1947), sold to Arnold Line and renamed Mackinac Islander
Drummond Islander II, in use 1961–89, sold to MCM Marine as tugboat

St. Clair River
 Champion's Auto Ferry, Harsens Island, connecting M-154 to the mainland
Arthur R Champion (1941)
North Channel (1967)
South Channel (1973)
Middle Channel (1996)
 Walpole–Algonac Ferry
 Sombra–Marine City (Bluewater) Ferry
Daldean of Chatham
Ontamich (built 1939)
Former vessel
Lowell D of Chatham

Detroit River
 Detroit–Windsor Truck Ferry

Internal
Ironton Ferry, southern arm of Lake Charlevoix, the Charlevoix a cable ferry built 1926 has a capacity of 4 cars.

Passenger-only ferries

Lake Superior

Isle Royale

Isle Royale Queen IV, Copper Harbor, Michigan to Rock Harbor, Isle Royale National Park, 3.5 hours
Ranger III, Houghton, Michigan to Rock Harbor, Isle Royale, 6 hours
Sea Hunter, Grand Portage, Minnesota to Windigo, Isle Royale, 1.5 hours
Voyageur II, Grand Portage, Minnesota to Isle Royale, 2–7.5 hours, multiple stops

Grand Island
Grand Island ferry, Grand Island National Recreation Area

Lake Michigan

Manitou Islands
Mishe-Mokwa, Manitou Island Transit, North Manitou Island, 1 hour, and South Manitou Island, 1.5 hours

Little Traverse Bay
Jacob's Run, the Little Traverse Bay Ferry, begun 2020, connecting  Petoskey, Harbor Springs and Bay Harbor on Little Traverse Bay, half hour trip, a previous ferry on this route closed in the 1940s

Straits of Mackinac

Arnold Transit Company (purchased by Star Line in 2016)
Current boats
Algomah (1961)
Beaver, (1952), freight
Chippewa (1962)
Corsair (1955), freight
Huron (1955)
Mackinac Express (1987), catamaran
Mackinac Islander (1947), formerly Drummond Islander, freight
Ottawa (1959)
Straits Express (1995), catamaran
Straits of Mackinac II (1969)
Former boats
Emerald Isle Built 1955 for Beaver Island Boat Company. Owned by Arnold Line from 1962 to 1982. Now in Detroit as the Diamond Jack.
Algomah (built 1881), in use until the 1930s
Chippewa, 1883 to 1943 ran a Cheboygan–Mackinac Island–Sault Ste. Marie route
Detroit, later called Iroquois (built 1922)
Mackinac (1909)
Mackinac Islander (1922), in use 1938–69, originally The Oliver H. Perry, later freighter and sank as Alaska crab fishing boat Belair in 1974
Mackinac Islander (1958), sold in the 1980s, now Diamond Belle of Diamond Jack's River Cruises on the Detroit River
Mohawk (1956), since 1995 Diamond Queen of Diamond Jack's River Cruises
Island Express (1988), catamaran, now Pictured Rocks Express of Pictured Rocks Cruises in Munising, Michigan.
Straits Express (1995), catamaran, now in New York City being used as a commuter ferry for Hornblower Cruises.
Shepler's Ferry
Capt. Shepler (1986)
Felicity (1972)
The Hope (1976)
Miss Margy (2015) 
Sacre Bleu (1959), formerly Put-in-Bay, freight
The Welcome (1969)
Wyandot (1979)
Star Line Ferry, (originally Argosy Boat Line (1962 -1977))

Current boats
La Salle (1983)
Radisson (1988)
Cadillac (1990)
Joliet (1993)
Marquette II (2005)
Anna May (2012)

Retired boats
La Salle
Nicolet
Treasure Islander
Flamingo
Marquette (1979)

St. Clair River 
Russell Island Ferry (private)

Internal
Diane, the Saugatuck Chain Ferry, a chain ferry across the Kalamazoo River at Saugatuck, site of a ferry since 1838

Defunct ferries

Lake Michigan

Rail ferries to Wisconsin

The Ann Arbor Railroad, Grand Trunk, and Chesapeake and Ohio ran train ferries across Lake Michigan. Several of these also carried passengers in the upper decks.
Ann Arbor Railroad ran ferries from Betsie Lake, Elberta, Michigan to Manistique, Michigan and Kewaunee, Wisconsin from 1892, Menominee, Michigan from 1894, Gladstone, Michigan from 1895, Manitowoc, Wisconsin from 1896. Service ended in 1982.
 (built 1892), burned to the waterline, 1910
 (1892), in use until 1912, converted to barge Whale, a sandsucker
 (1898)
 (1906), sold to the state to ferry autos at Mackinac, renamed City of Cheboygan, 1937 
 (1910), sold to Bultema Dredge & Dock Co in 1967, used for the construction of the Palisades Nuclear Power Plant near South Haven. 150 ft of stern sank on way to Padnos salvage in 1970. Stern rediscovered in May 2005 by Michigan Shipwreck Research Association(MSRA)
 (1917), renamed Arthur K. Atkinson in 1959, served a route from Frankfort, Michigan to Manitowoc, Wisconsin from 1980-1982
 (1925), rebuilt as Viking and in service until 1982
Maitland No. 1, chartered for part of 1915
 (1927)
, a Grand Trunk Western vessel was leased in 1978.
Grand Trunk Milwaukee Car Ferry Company ran rail ferries from Grand Haven, Michigan to Milwaukee, Wisconsin from 1903 to 1933. From 1933 to 1978 the route was Muskegon to Milwaukee.
 (built 1902) formerly Manistique, Marquette & Northern 1, sank near Milwaukee in 1929, with 52 dead
 (built 1903)
 (1926)
 (1927)
, (built 1930), sailed for Grand Trunk until 1978.

Pere Marquette Railway, later part of the Chesapeake and Ohio Railway, ran rail ferries from Ludington to Milwaukee, Wisconsin, Kewaunee, Wisconsin and Manitowoc, Wisconsin in Wisconsin. Their superintendent for over 30 years was William L. Mercereau. The last route (Kewaunee) ended on July 1, 1983. Michigan-Wisconsin Transportation Company acquired the ferries and ran until 1990.
Pere Marquette 15 (built 1896), in service 1900–35
Pere Marquette 16 (1895), in service 1900–14, worked for Detroit, Grand Rapids & Western 1898–99
Pere Marquette 17 (1901), in service until 1940, converted to auto ferry in 1940 at Straits of Mackinac, scrapped in 1961
Pere Marquette 18 (1st) (1902), in service until 1910, sank in Lake Michigan with 29 lives lost
Pere Marquette 19 (1903), in service until 1940
Pere Marquette 20 (1903), in service until 1938, converted to auto ferry at Straits of Mackinac in 1938, converted to warehouse in 1959
Pere Marquette 18 (2nd) (1911), in service until 1952
Pere Marquette 21 (1924), in service until 1973
Pere Marquette 22 (1924), in service until 1973
City of Saginaw 31 (1929), in service until 1973
City of Flint 32 (1930), in service until 1969, converted to barge Roanoke
SS City of Midland 41 (1941), in use until 1983, now the barge Pere Marquette 41
SS Badger (1952), in use until 1990, later converted to an auto ferry, still in that service
SS Spartan (1952), in use until 1979, laid up in Ludington, used for parts for Badger

Passenger and auto ferries
Wisconsin and Michigan Steamship Company
Illinois
SS Milwaukee Clipper (built 1904), in use 1941–70, Muskegon, Michigan to Milwaukee, Wisconsin, 900 passengers and 180 autos

Straits of Mackinac
Before the construction of the Mackinac Bridge connecting the two peninsulas of Michigan, car and train ferries crossed between Mackinaw City, Michigan and St. Ignace. The early transport across the Straits was by private boat. The first large commercial concerns were the railways whose ferries pioneered concepts in ice breaking and ship design. The state took over auto traffic after complaints that the railways service was too expensive and unreliable for motorists.

Early ferries
Mary Queen
Gazelle
Lotus

Straits of Mackinac auto ferries
The state provided auto ferry service between 1923 and 1957. The ferries carried almost 1 million cars a year in the mid-1950s before the bridge opened in 1957. At that time, there were five ferries running with a total capacity of 500 cars; the largest ferry could carry 150. In their last year of service, the state ferries employed 400 people.
Michigan State Ferries
Ariel (bought used 1923) unused after 1923, sold 1925
Sainte Ignace (1924) sold 1940
Mackinaw City (1924) sold 1940
The Straits of Mackinac (1928)
City of Cheboygan (1937), formerly Ann Arbor No.4
City of Munising (1938), formerly Pere Marquette 20
City of Petoskey (1940) formerly Pere Marquette 17
Vacationland (1952), largest ferry, made last run of the service in November, 1957.

Rail ferries across the Straits of Mackinac

Mackinac Transportation Company formed in 1881 by Grand Rapids & Indiana, Michigan Central, and Detroit, Mackinac, and Marquette railroads. Service continued until 1984 when the dock at St. Ignace collapsed. From 1923 until 1952, the Sainte Marie II and Chief Wawatam carried autos for the state ferry service during the heavy ice periods in winter.
Algomah (1880–95), also towed the rail barge Betsy, after 1895 sold to Island Transportation Company
St. Ignace
Saint Marie I 
Saint Marie II (1912–61)
Chief Wawatam (1910–84), the last hand-fed coal steamer on the Great Lakes

Mackinac Island
Island Transportation Company was part owned by George Arnold and employed Bill Shepler as one of its captains. The service ran from St. Ignace to Mackinac Island. It merged with the Arnold Line (whose service was Mackinaw City to Mackinac Island) in June 1946.
Algoma, (built 1880), in service from 1895
Algoma II (1922), in service 1936–46, later with Arnold Line until 1960

Sault Ste. Marie (St. Mary's River)

Dime, first steam ferry at Soo, wood-fired
American-based company started by Sam Bernier (by 1865 - 1903)
M.I. Mills (in service by 1865 - ), passenger only 
 International Transit Company (Canadian company) (1901 - 1962)
Bawating, (1910-1915) passenger ferry (had been Fortune running Detroit-Windsor route) 
Agoming, (1926-1962), auto ferry
James W. Curran, (1947-1962), auto ferry
John A. McPhail, (1955-1962) auto ferry
International Transit Company was purchased by Ontario during the building of the Sault Ste. Marie International Bridge; the government operated the ferries until the bridge opened in 1962.

St. Clair River
Many ferries carried passengers, mostly between Sarnia and Port Huron before the Blue Water Bridge opened in 1938. In 1937, ferries had carried 1,174,846 passengers, 220,555 automobiles, 1,222 trucks and 267 motorcycles. Rail transport continued for many years.
Early ferries
The first licensed ferry was in 1836, a sailboat owned by Crampton
George Moffat began a ferry service with a craft made of 3 canoes and powered by two ponies in the 1840s
A 4-horse boat and a 4-mule boat were in competition in the later 1840s
United, the first steam powered ferry owned by Moffatt began service in 1850
Sarnia, a paddlewheel steamer was brought into service by Moffatt in 1860, burned in 1877
G.A. Brush, 1860s, competitor to Moffatt's Sarnia
Fanny White, 1860s, competitor to Moffatt's Sarnia
Mystic, in service in 1877
Essex (built 1859, original route Detroit-Windsor)
Port Huron Ferry Company formed in 1891 with ferries already in service, Company was bought out by state of Michigan in 1937 to prevent competition with the new bridge.
Grace Dormer (built 1868-after 1923), abandoned by 1925 when it was destroyed in a fire at a boneyard in Buffalo
James Beard (in use 1873-after 1923)
Omar D. Conger (1882-1922), on March 26, 1922 exploded at dock in Black River, 4 deaths
J.C. Clark, at Sarnia-Port Huron from late 1880s, burned 1905
Hiawatha, at Sarnia-Port Huron from late 1880s until about 1923
City of Cheboygan, renamed City of Port Huron at Port Huron-Sarnia 1917 to 1937, sank at dock 1939
Ariel, 1920s-1937, sold for scrap 1941
Louis Philippe, 1921 only, first auto ferry at Port Huron-Sarnia
Lawrence, 1921-1934, first auto ferry at Port Huron-Sarnia
City of Sarnia, 1923-1937, sold for scrap 1953, largest ferry could carry 1000 passengers and 42 autos. 
Blue Water Ferry Company (1946-1957) using converted military landing craft as passenger only ferries and reusing the older ship's names.
City of Sarnia 
City of Port Huron
Rail ferries served Sarnia, Ontario to Port Huron, Michigan from 1859 to 1890.
The earliest ferry was a chain ferry on a 1000-foot chain across the river in the 1860s. The unpowered vessel and its chain became a navigation concern.
Grand Trunk/Canadian National
International (1872), hull built in England, assembled in Canada, later in use for Pere Marquette on St. Clair River from 1903–27
Huron, (1875), hull built in England, assembled in Canada
Pere Marquette Railroad
International (1872), built for Grand Trunk, later in use for Pere Marquette on St. Clair River from 1903–27
Pere Marquette 10 (built 1945), in use as ferry until 1974, in use as barge until 1995
Pere Marquette 12 (1927), sold to Canadian National in 1969, renamed St. Clair, converted to barge 1980s, in use until 1995
Pere Marquette 14 (1904), in use until 1957
CSX service ended October 7, 1994

Detroit River

Detroit to Windsor
Passenger and auto ferries
Early ferries, ordered by date of entering service 
Among the earliest ferry service were the canoes owned by Louis Davenport, which were fitted with runners and pushed across the ice in wintertime
Olive Branch (the Horse Ferry), (1825-?), a horse-powered siddewheeler, could carry wagons and cattle
Argo, (1830-1834), first steamboat ferry at Detroit
Lady of the Lake (1834-?)
United (1836-1853) later called Alliance, then called Undine 
Argo No. 2, built in 1848, in use until 1880
Ottawa, mostly used as tow barge due to oversupply of ferry boats in the 1860s
Windsor (1856-1866), steamer, burned with the loss of 30 lives, April 23, 1866 (hull rebuilt as barge, in use until it sank in Green Bay in 1893)
Mohawk, built about 1844 for British Revenue Service, ferry at Detroit mid-1850s, one of the first iron boats on the Great Lakes, later used on Great Lakes as passenger steamer, sank Lake Huron
Gem (1858-?), sidewheeler (ran Detroit to Amherstburg its first season)
Essex (built 1859 - in use until 1877), sold for use as ferry from Port Huron to Sarnia
Detroit (1862-1875), pulled burning Windsor out of dock in 1866, itself burned at Sandwich in September, 1875
Clara, early 1860s, screw steamer, ran Detroit-Windsor in winter, Detroit-Fort Wayne in summer
Favorite, in use 1867, out of service within a few years
Detroit Ferry Company and the Windsor Ferry Company combined in 1877 to form the Detroit and Windsor Ferry Company. In 1883 the company was renamed Detroit, Belle Isle and Windsor Ferry Company. It served Amhurstburg, Detroit, Windsor, Belle Isle, Bois Blanc Island (Boblo), and owned Peche Island.
Hope (built 1870) ("soon after converted into a propeller for lake service")
Victoria (1872), the first Great Lakes ferry built with ice-breaking hull
Fortune (1875-1910), later Bawating ferry at Sault Ste. Marie (1910-1915), converted to a tug and sank off Jekyll Island, Georgia, 1920
Excelsior (1876)
Garland (1880)
Sappho (1883), originally part of Walkerville and Detroit Ferry Company
Promise (1892)
Pleasure (1894)
Britannia (1906)
Lasalle (1922)
Cadillac (1928)
Walkerville and Detroit Ferry Company formed in 1881 by Hiram Walker and served a route from Detroit to Belle Isle to Walkerville, Ontario. Service ended in 1942.
Essex (built 1913), converted to tug 1942, ended career in Peru
Ariel (1882)

Detroit to Belle Isle ferry
Belle Isle Park, 1840–1957

Detroit to Boblo Island

Ferry service ran to the island from 1898-1993 by the Bois Blanc Excursion Line (part of the Detroit, Belle Island, and Windsor Ferry Company)
 , Detroit to Boblo Island Amusement Park on Bois Blanc Island, 1.5 hours, 1902–91
 SS Ste. Clair, 1.5 hours, 1910–91

Detroit to Windsor rail ferries
Canadian National CN discontinued passenger service in 1955.

 SS Lansdowne (built 1884), served until 1956, scrapped 2009, a sidewheel paddleboat
 Huron
 Great Western
Canadian Pacific
Michigan
Ontario 
 Grand Trunk
 Michigan Central
Transport (built 1880)
Transfer (1873)
Transfer II
Detroit
 Wabash Railroad, later Norfolk Southern purchased three ferries from Michigan Central in 1910 when the Michigan Central tunnel opened. The service continued until April 30, 1994.
Transport (built 1880), in use until 1933
Transfer II, in use until 1938
Detroit
Manitowoc (built 1926)
Windsor (1930)

Grosse Ile to Gordon, Ontario rail ferry
 Ferry from Grosse Ile to Gordon, Ontario between 1873 and 1888 on the Canada Southern Railway, later Michigan Central

Lake Erie
Michigan-Ohio Navigation Company
SS Aquarama, (built 1945), in use 1957–62, Detroit to Cleveland, Ohio, 2,500 passengers and 160 automobiles
Detroit-Atlantic Navigation Company of Detroit, MI.
MV Jack Dalton, the former Michigan state ferry Vacationland, was used briefly in the summer of 1960 to ship truck trailers in "fishyback" service between Detroit and Cleveland, OH. The venture quickly proved uneconomical and the service was suspended within 90 days of inauguration. Michigan seized the ferry for non-payment and resold the ship for use off lakes.

References

Further reading

External links

The Ludington Carferries
Ironton Ferry
Starline Mackinac Island Ferry